The 2022–23 Sacred Heart Pioneers men's ice hockey season was the 30th season of play for the program, the 25th at the Division I level, and the 20th in the Atlantic Hockey conference. The Pioneers represented Sacred Heart University and were coached by C. J. Marottolo, in his 14th season.

Season
The biggest development for the program was the completion of the Martire Family Arena. While the new arena had significantly less seating capacity, the chief advantage was being the first on-campus home for the team. Not only would this allow greater access for the program but it would also be much easier for the student body to attend games. Because the opening for the rink wouldn't be until January 2023, the team had to play the first half of the season at the Total Mortgage Arena.

Perhaps in anticipation of their new venue, Sacred Heart began the season well. While incumbent starter Justin Robbins began the season in goal, he was soon replaced by Luke Lush. With stable goaltending, the offense kicked into gear and pushed the Pioneers to a 6–2–1 record by early November. The hot start not only had the team at the top of the conference standings but also had them above the water line for an NCAA tournament berth (a rare thing for Atlantic Hockey). In mid-November, Sacred Heart had a showdown with the other conference leader, RIT. Unfortunately, at that exact moment the Pioneers' offense dried up and the team scored just 4 goals over their next 5 games. When they finally ended their slump, Sacred Heart had slid into the middle of the standings and was in the bottom half of the national rankings. Even by winning their next five games, including a surprising upset of Northeastern, Sacred Heart remained well away from an at-large bid and would likely have to win their conference tournament if it were to make the NCAA tournament.

After the winter break, with construction on schedule, Sacred Heart christened its new building by hosing #20 Boston College. With more than 4,000 in attendance, Sacred Heart lost the match but were still able to push the Eagles into overtime. Figures remained strong in the new building and the Pioneers saw at least 4,000 people in 6 of their final 7 home games. Unfortunately for the Pioneers, while the building was mostly full the product on the ice was a little more inconsistent. Sacred Heart ended up going 3–5–1 in the last month of the season, including losing the season series to American International, and ended up 3rd in the conference.

The Pioneers began the postseason with a win over Niagara, however, everything went sour afterwards. After opening the scoring in the second game, Sacred Heart went the final 53 minutes without a goal and lost 1–4 despite firing 38 shots on goal. The offense was a bit better in the rubber match but the penalty kill imploded. The Purple Eagles scored three power play goals, the final being the eventual game-winner, and ran the Pioneers out of their own building. It was a disappointing end to what had once been a successful season.

Departures

Recruiting

Roster
.

Standings

Schedule and results

|-
!colspan=12 style=";" | Exhibition

|-
!colspan=12 style=";" | Regular Season

|-
!colspan=12 style=";" | 

|-
!colspan=12 style=";" |

Scoring statistics

Goaltending statistics

Rankings

Note: USCHO did not release a poll in weeks 1, 13, or 26.

References

2022–23
2022–23 Atlantic Hockey men's ice hockey season
2022–23 NCAA Division I men's ice hockey by team
2023 in sports in Connecticut
2022 in sports in Connecticut